Ohouo Guy Landry Edi (born December 26, 1988) is an Ivorian-French basketball player and a member of the Côte d'Ivoire national basketball team.

Early life
Born in Agboville, Ivory Coast and raised in Paris, France, Edi later moved to the United States and joined the basketball team of Sylmar High School in Sylmar, California as a sophomore in February 2007. Edi transferred to Van Nuys High School the following fall but was not granted eligibility by his school district. Edi attended Stoneridge Preparatory School as a senior.

College career
While originally looking at the University of Miami at Florida, he instead went to Midland College of the NJCAA and then transferred to Gonzaga University and played for the Bulldogs.

From 2006 to 2008, Edi played some games for Paris-Levallois Basket of LNB Pro A. Because of his playing time there, Edi served an eight-game suspension for an exhibition game and first eight regular season games of the 2011–12 season with Gonzaga for violating NCAA rules on amateurism. Edi made his first career start on January 21, 2012 against San Diego, with eight points and four rebounds in 26 minutes. As a junior, Edi averaged 5.5 points and 2.4 rebounds.

As a senior in 2012–13, Edi started the first 11 games but played fewer minutes in the second half of the season. He ended the season averaging only 3.0 points and 2.1 rebounds.

Professional career
From 2013 to 2015, Edi played for Champagne Châlons-Reims, then with STB Le Havre from 2015 to 2016. In January 2017 he signed with Saint-Chamond.

In January 2021, Edi signed with Úrvalsdeild karla club Þór Akureyri. In 19 games, he averaged 11.3 points and 7.1 rebounds per game.

International competition
Edi is also a member of the Ivory Coast national basketball team and played for the team for the first time at the 2010 FIBA World Championship in Turkey.

References

External links
Profile at Proballers.com
Profile at Eurobasket.com
Icelandic statistics at Icelandic Basketball Association

1988 births
Living people
2010 FIBA World Championship players
2019 FIBA Basketball World Cup players
Champagne Châlons-Reims Basket players
French expatriate basketball people in the United States
French men's basketball players
Gonzaga Bulldogs men's basketball players
Ivorian emigrants to France
Ivorian expatriate basketball people in France
Ivorian men's basketball players
Midland Chaps basketball players
People from Agboville
Þór Akureyri men's basketball players
Small forwards
STB Le Havre players
Úrvalsdeild karla (basketball) players